The K-31 truck, a US Signal Corps designation for an Autocar U8144 truck with York-Hoover van body, was used as the power truck for the SCR-270, an early warning radar of World War II. The power it delivered to the radar came from a PE-74 generator.
2) 3) 4) Similar vehicles were the K-30 and K-62 or K-62-A, all three operating trucks for the SCR-270. K-31 differed in cubic feet and overall height from K-30 and K-62. The K-62 AND K-62A were the successors of both the K-30 and K-31.
Note the difference in form of the wheel arch of the van body between the depicted vehicles that shows that there must have been successive models from York-Hoover.
The third image in the gallery shows that the two panels at each side were folded up when the vehicles where operated, while the panels at the back where two halves that were folded up and down respectively.

Gallery

See also
List of US Signal Corps vehicles
List of U.S. military vehicles by supply number
Autocar U8144T
Autocar
K-30 Operating truck

Notes

2)FM 11-25
3)TM 11-1410
4)TM 11-1540

References
 TM 9-817
 TM 9-1817
 ORD 7 SNL G-511, 1949
 ORD 7 SNL G-511, 1952
 ORD 8 SNL G-511, 1952
 ORD 9 SNL G-511, 1945
FM 11–25
TM 11-1510
TM 11-1410
TM 9-2800, 1943

Military trucks of the United States
Military vehicles introduced from 1940 to 1944
Soft-skinned vehicles
World War II military vehicles
World War II vehicles of the United States
Motor vehicles manufactured in the United States